Tracy Petulia Davidson-Celestine (born 20 September 1978) is a Tobagonian politician who is the former Secretary of Health, Wellness and Family Development, as well as a former Councillor in the Tobago House of Assembly (THA) becoming one of the leading members addressing the COVID-19 pandemic in Tobago. She is the first female political leader in the THA, a defeated Chief Secretary  candidate,  the first woman to lead a Tobagonian party with representation in the House of Representatives and Tobago House of Assembly and one of the first bilingual political leaders in Trinidad and Tobago, as a result she has been popularly referred to by the nickname Boss Lady.

She previously served as Trinidad and Tobago's Ambassador to Costa Rica 2017 to 2020 before being elected as political leader of the Tobago Council of the People's National Movement since the 2020 leadership election, where she became the first female political leader of the People's National Movement in a regional or national capacity.

She previously served as Deputy Chief Secretary, tourism secretary and councillor in the Tobago House of Assembly.

Early life and education
Davidson-Celestine was born in the north eastern village of King's Bay, Delaford, Tobago and is the third of four children. She was educated at Signal Hill Secondary School before going on to study Leadership and Management at the Australian Institute of Business and UWI Cave Hill.

Political career

Leader of the PNM Tobago Council, 2020–2022

On 26 January 2020, Davidson-Celestine was elected political leader of the PNM Tobago Council, beating incumbent political leader and chief secretary, Kelvin Charles.

References

External links

 

 

People's National Movement politicians
University of the West Indies alumni
Living people
21st-century Trinidad and Tobago women politicians
21st-century Trinidad and Tobago politicians
Australian Institute of Business alumni
Members of the Tobago House of Assembly
1978 births